KAGH may refer to:

 KAGH (AM), a radio station (800 AM) licensed to serve Crossett, Arkansas, United States
 KAGH-FM, a radio station (104.9 FM) licensed to serve Crossett, Arkansas
 KAZN, a radio station (1300 AM) licensed to serve Pasadena, California, United States, which held the call sign KAGH from 1948 to 1950